899 Old Thorn Run Road in Moon Township, Allegheny County, Pennsylvania, was built in 1814.  The house was added to the List of Pittsburgh History and Landmarks Foundation Historic Landmarks in 1988.

References

Houses in Allegheny County, Pennsylvania
Houses completed in 1814
Pittsburgh History & Landmarks Foundation Historic Landmarks